Alkalihalobacillus krulwichiae is a Gram-positive, obligate alkaliphilic and facultatively anaerobic bacterium from the genus of Alkalihalobacillus which has been isolated from soil from Tsukuba.

References

Bacillaceae
Bacteria described in 2003